Herman Høst (born 17 April 1926) is a Norwegian physician.

Høst was born in Bærum as a son of physician Herman Fleischer Høst. He graduated with the cand.med. degree in 1951 and took the dr.med. degree in 1966. He was a chief physician at the Norwegian Radium Hospital from 1974 and a professor at of radiological cancer therapy at the University of Oslo from 1975. From 1980 to 1985 he was the dean of the Faculty of Medicine. He was also a member of the Norwegian Academy of Science and Letters. He retired in 1996. Høst celebrated his 95th birthday in 2021.

References

1926 births
Living people
Norwegian nuclear medicine physicians
Academic staff of the University of Oslo
Members of the Norwegian Academy of Science and Letters
People from Bærum